Parablechnum procerum, synonym Blechnum procerum, commonly known as mountain kiokio or small kiokio, is a species of fern found in New Zealand. It is found from lowland to alpine areas among forest, scrub and tussock.

P. procerum usually grows to a height of between 30 and 50 cm.

References 

Blechnaceae
Ferns of New Zealand